The 2018 Provo Premier League is the 18th season of the top football division in the Turks and Caicos Islands. The season began on 13 January and concluded on 29 September 2018.

Standings

Notes:
The senior side of Academy were renamed Academy Jaguars, to distinguish them from their junior side, new entrants Academy Eagles
Small World United and Teachers withdrew

References

Provo Premier League
Turks and Caicos Islands
Turks and Caicos Islands